Fool Around With is a British reality TV show, where four women or men are locked up together with a single person, who tries to determine which of the four contestants is also single; the other three contestants have boyfriends or girlfriends. If the lone single person figures out which of the four contestants is also single, the person wins £10,000.

The series airs on Channel 4, and every episode has a unique name, such as "Fool Around With the Cheeky Girls", "Fool Around With Fran", "Fool Around With Nadia", "Fool Around with John Nettles", "Fool Around With Jean Mudge", etc. One of the more memorable contestants on the show were The Cheeky Girls, who failed to find out who was the true single. TV presenter Charlie Webster was also on the show.
The show has also been broadcast in Sweden on TV400.

Channel4 planned new episodes of Fool Around With during 2007 after the successful first season.

The show has also been shown on Hungarian CoolTV as Szinglicsapda, a French version called Jouer n'est pas Tromper had two seasons in 2006/2007 and there was a short lived Spanish version on Telecinco entitled Engano.
It has also aired on Japanese reality TV.
The show is currently available to American viewers on Amazon Unbox and AOLvideo, it can also be seen on bittorrents official site.

References

External links
cast fool around with
article
About fool around with Channel4 homepage
Fool around with additional info Channel 4 homepage
Info of fool around with Swedish broadcast
Info from Channel4

British reality television series